Ampangabe is a rural municipality in Madagascar.

Population
The population consists of 90% Merina, 5% Besileo, and 5% Antandroy.

Agriculture
Mainly rice is grown in the town.

Rivers
3 rivers cross the village: Andromba river (west), Sisaony (in the north-east), Ikopa River (northern border).

Religion
69% of the population are Protestants, 25% are Catholic.

Roads
The municipality is linked with the National road 4 by the Provincial road29.

References  

Populated places in Analamanga